Anchan is a surname. Notable people with the surname include:

Ali Sher Khan Anchan (1590–1625), Tibetan Balti king 
Shamata Anchan (born 1990), Indian model and television actress